Regla (Spanish: "Rule") can refer to:

Regla, a municipality of Havana, Cuba
La Regla de Perandones, one of 54 parish councils in Cangas del Narcea 
Santería, a syncretic religion also called La Regla de Ocha or La Regla Lucumi
Guaracheros de Regla, a carnival comparsa of Havana, Cuba
Salvia regla, a mountain sage endemic to west Texas
Palo (religion) also called Regla de Palo

People
Regla Bell (born 1970), Cuban Olympic volleyball athlete
Regla Torres (born 1975), Cuban Olympic volleyball athlete
Regla Cárdenas  (born 1975), Cuban heptathlete
Regla Leyén (born 1979), Cuban Olympic judo athlete

See also
La Regla (disambiguation)